The Second Kurti cabinet was formed in Kosovo on 22 March 2021 following a deal between the political parties Vetëvendosje, Guxo, Progressive Democratic Party, New Democratic Initiative of Kosovo, Turkish Democratic Party of Kosovo and New Democratic Party.

Actions
On 22 March 2021, Albin Kurti was confirmed as Prime Minister of Kosovo by the Assembly of Kosovo after the parliamentary elections of 14 February 2021 with sixty seven pros and thirty votes against.

Composition
The cabinet consists of the following ministers:

References

Cabinets established in 2021
2021 establishments in Kosovo
Kurti